Saqqez Airport, sometimes called Saghez Airport,  is a domestic airport under construction near Saqqez located in the province of Kurdistan in Iran.
This airport has been constructed for the use of the people of the northern cities of Kurdistan province and the southern cities of West Azerbaijan, especially the free trade zones of Baneh and Marivan.

History

Start date 
Saqqez Airport was started in 2005 with a credit of 15,000 million Rials (from regional development and balance credits) on the southeastern side of Saqez at km (0 + 500) of Marivan Road with an area of 220 hectares.

Commissioning Saqqez airport in 2021
Kurdistan Province governor said :"The Saqqez city airport in the Kurdistan Province (western Iran) will be commissioned fully by the end of 9th month of next Iranian year ( December 21, 2021), the Head of Iran Airports and Air Navigation Company (IAC) Siavash Amir Mokri said, Trend reports citing the Ministry of Roads and Urban Development of Iran".

The first phase 
The first phase of the airport opened on July 21, 2021, and the first Flight Check aircraft landed at the airport.

The Airport specifications 
This airport has an area of 220 hectares, has a runway with a length of 2,930 meters, a taxiway with a length of 450 meters, an apron with an area of 2,500 square meters, and an access route to the airport of 450 meters. Also, the airport terminal building with an area of 2,298 square meters includes a waiting hall and transit, and a side building with an area of 330 square meters has been constructed.

References 

Airports in Iran
Saqqez County